Chris Mercogliano is an American author who writes about alternative education. Since 1973, he has been a teacher with the Albany Free School, eventually becoming its director

Bibliography

Mercogliano, Chris (1998).  Making It Up As We Go Along: The Story of the Albany Free School.  Portsmouth, NH: Heinemann.  
Mercogliano, Chris (2003).  Teaching the Restless: One School's Remarkable No-Ritalin Approach to Helping Children Learn and Succeed.  Boston, MA: Beacon Press.    
Mercogliano, Chris (2006).  How to Grow a School: Starting and Sustaining Schools That Work.  New York, NY: Oxford Village Press. 
Mercogliano, Chris (2007).  In Defense of Childhood: Protecting Kids' Inner Wildness.  Boston, MA: Beacon Press.

References

External links
Personal website

American education writers
American male non-fiction writers
Living people
Year of birth missing (living people)